Gurband (also Romanized as Gūrband; also known as Gavarbaad, Gavārband, and Qal‘eh-ye Gūrband) is a village in Gurband Rural District, in the Central District of Minab County, Hormozgan Province, Iran. At the 2006 census, its population was 2,444, in 615 families.

References 

Populated places in Minab County